Twahir Muhiddin is an association football coach who manages Kenyan Premier League side Bandari. He was the assistant coach of the Kenya national team under German coach Antoine Hey.

On September 17, 2010, Harambee Stars coach Twahir Muhiddin quit as coach of the Kenya national football team following Kenya's 1-0 loss to Guinea-Bissau in the 2012 AFCON qualifiers.

References

Kenyan football managers
Living people
Year of birth missing (living people)